The South American Energy Summit is the name for one of a sequence of summits bringing together delegations from the countries of the Union of South American Nations to discuss energy related issues.

First South American Energy Summit
The first South American Energy Summit took place on April 16–17 2007, on Isla Margarita, in the Venezuelan state of Nueva Esparta. Ten of the 12 South American presidents attend in person, the exceptions being Tabaré Vázquez of Uruguay and Alan García of Peru. Among the issues discussed was the production of ethanol fuel in the region, over which the countries have differing views. It was agreed that a new South American Energy Council, headed by the energy ministers of the 12 countries, would be created to co-ordinate energy policy, while the prospect of a future South American Energy Treaty was also raised. 

On non-energy topics, the presidents also agreed that the South American Community of Nations should be renamed the Union of South American Nations.

See also

South American Organization of Gas Producers and Exporters

References

Summits of the Union of South American Nations
2007 in Venezuela 
Energy in South America
Energy in Argentina
Energy in Bolivia
Energy in Brazil
Energy in Chile
Energy in Colombia
Energy in Ecuador
Energy in Guyana
Energy in Paraguay
Energy in Peru
Energy in Suriname
Energy in Uruguay
Energy in Venezuela